The Oldsmobile Silhouette is a minivan manufactured by General Motors for model years 1990–2004 over two generations. 

Production ended when General Motors discontinued its Oldsmobile brand in 2004.  GM continued to market badge engineered variants, the Saturn Relay and the Buick Terraza for the MY2005.

Background
General Motors' first attempt at producing a minivan to compete with the Chrysler minivans, the rear wheel drive, truck-based Chevrolet Astro and its twin, the GMC Safari failed to compete strongly against Chrysler's dominance in the minivan market in the 1980s. The 1990 Oldsmobile Silhouette and its sibling models, sold more successfully than the Astro/Safari predecessors.

First shown to the public in 1986, the Pontiac Trans Sport concept car featured futuristic styling, individually removable bucket seats with built-in stereo speakers, a gull-wing rear passenger door and extensive use of glass including a glass-paneled roof.

The Trans Sport was approved for production without the gullwing door and the glass roof. Chevrolet and Oldsmobile received production vehicles based on the Trans Sport with the Lumina APV and Silhouette respectively. While the Pontiac Trans Sport was targeted at sport- and style-oriented buyers, the Lumina and Silhouette targeted the value and premium markets respectively.

First generation (1990–1996)

The first 1990 Oldsmobile Silhouette was manufactured on August 1, 1989. Assembled in General Motors' North Tarrytown Assembly assembly facility, these U platform vans consisted of a galvanized steel space frame wrapped in composite plastic body panels that were impervious to rust and minor dents and dings, a manufacturing technique developed on the Pontiac Fiero and also used extensively on General Motors' Saturn line of vehicles.

The Silhouette was available with seating for seven, with the five lightweight rear seats being individually reconfigurable and removable. In 1994 built-in child seats were added to the option list, which provided the ability to switch two of the rear seats between adult and child seating with the pull of a seat-mounted tab.

Included with the level ride package, which utilized a compressor and air-pressurized rear shock absorbers to maintain vehicle height regardless of load, was a control panel and air hose kit that allowed the vehicle to be used to inflate tires, air mattresses, sporting equipment and such.

In 1994, a remote-controlled power sliding door feature was added, a General Motors innovation.

For the 1994 and 1995 model years, traction control was available with the 3800 engine option.

The first generation Silhouette was not available in Canada.

European Market

Europeans grew accustomed to sleek minivans thanks to the Renault Espace and did not object to the futuristic styling. For the European market, however, the Oldsmobile Silhouette was sold as the Pontiac Trans Sport by replacing the Oldsmobile badging with Pontiac badging, along with Pontiac wheels. Sales in Europe were good for an American import, but did not represent enough volume to make a fourth, distinct model economically feasible. 
Like the Oldsmobile Silhouette, the European Trans Sport did not receive any facelift, as the vans' initial styling had not been negatively received there.

The Pontiac Trans Sport of Europe was discontinued in 1997. Its successors were both the Chevrolet Trans Sport (Second gen Pontiac Trans Sport rebadged as a Chevrolet) (LWB), and the Opel Sintra (SWB). In the United Kingdom, it was sold as the Vauxhall Sintra.

Engines
1989–1995 LG6 3.1 V6
1992–1995 3800 V6 (optional)
1996 LA1 3400 V6

Modest sales success
The design of these minivans was controversial. At the time that the Oldsmobile Silhouette and its siblings were conceived, no one had tried to market a stylish or sporty minivan, and GM felt that this represented a potentially large market segment. They styled these minivans to be lower and sleeker than the competing brands. The extremely large, long and sloped windshield and the resultant long distance to the base of the windshield when sitting in the driver's seat made for a disconcerting driving experience until a person could adjust to the "different" proportions. Automotive magazines christened the new minivans "dustbuster" after a household appliance with a similar profile.

The first engine in these vans was a meager 3.1 L V6, that produced only , which was not up to the task of hauling these fairly heavy vehicles.

In 1992, the Silhouette and its siblings received the  3.8 L 3800 V6 as an option, which provided better torque and acceleration, making them the most powerful as well as best handling minivans then in production.

Production of first generation Silhouettes and stablemates ended in 1996, at which time the Tarrytown, NY plant which produced them and which had been in operation since 1900, was shuttered and scheduled for demolition. The final 1st generation U-body Oldsmobile was assembled on June 26, 1996.

Year to year changes

 1990 - All new model- The Silhouette in keeping with its positioning as GM's luxury minivan offering is available with optional leather seating, a feature not available on its platform mates and available only on the Chrysler Town and Country among competing manufacturer's models.
 1991 - Customer complaints, regarding glare reflected on the interior of the windshield from the massive expanse of dashboard, led to the addition of black carpeting in lieu of the more-reflective plastic used in the previous year.
 1992
Newly available for 1992 was GM's 3800 V6 engine coupled with a Hydra-Matic 4T60-E 4-speed electronically controlled automatic transmission.
The cowl-mounted fixed radio antenna was eliminated, and an integrated roof antenna was installed, sandwiched between the roof and the headliner.
Side view mirrors were changed to the folding type, and were enlarged to provide better rear visibility.
Brakes were enlarged and anti-lock brakes (ABS) were added as standard equipment.
A pop-up sunroof was added to the options list.
Steering wheel-mounted controls for the stereo system were added as an option.

 1993
The Silhouette's exterior is facelifted, sporting wrap-around turn signal/parking lamps in front, along with standard foglamps.
Tail lights' design is changed from a grid to a solid red color with black "dissolves" around the edges, a style that had been used exclusively on the Pontiac Trans Sport previously.
A remote controlled power sliding side door was announced for 1993, but failed to actually make it into production.
A redesigned center console was added this year with revamped, larger climate controls, a large storage cubby and a large storage bin at its base.
1994
In an effort to lessen the perceived distance to the base of the windshield, a ridge was added to the interior dash finishing panel.
A remote-controlled power sliding door became available as an option.
Built-in child seats for the second row became available as an option.
A traction control system became available as an option.
Rear deep-tinted windows now featured a darker tint than previously used.
A driver's side airbag became standard equipment.
A roof rack became standard on all Silhouettes and their subsequent model years, but remained optional on the Chevrolet and Pontiac.
1995
Automatic power door locks that engaged/disengaged with the transmission shifting into or out of "park" added as a standard feature of the power door lock option package.
1996
Final year of production. Replaced in 1997 by an all-new design carrying the same name.
Both 3.1 and 3.8 L V6 engines were dropped, the 3.4 L 3400 V6 engine became the only engine available.
Traction control dropped as an option.

Second generation (1997–2004)

The redesigned 1997 Silhouette was built at Doraville Assembly. The first 1997 Silhouettes were assembled in August, 1996. Canadian sales began as a 1998 model. Unlike the Venture and Trans Sport/Montana, the roof rack was standard on all Silhouettes. GM continued to offer the Silhouette as their premium luxurious minivan, the Trans Sport/Montana as the sporty one, and the Venture as the basic version. The base model (only offered for 1997) was the only model to offer short-wheelbase and a driver side sliding door being only optional, when all the other trim levels of the Silhouette were in long-wheelbase extended version and offered a standard driver side sliding door.

Having achieved second place in sales to Chrysler, General Motors brought out an entirely new U platform series of minivans, theoretically based on the lessons learned from its previous missteps. GM, still stinging from the criticism of the previous "dustbuster" minivans, the new Silhouette would be completely conventional in all respects. The vehicle would be of steel unibody construction, and styling would be as conservative as possible. The previous generation was a little too large for comfortably navigating European streets, so this new range of models would be narrower and slightly smaller than was the norm for the United States in order to produce a single range of minivans that GM hoped would fill the needs of both the North American and European markets.

New for this generation were cabin air filters, and the filters can be accessed from behind an access panel easily accessed from inside the glove compartment.

During the development of this generation of the U-body minivan, General Motors extensively benchmarked the then current Chrysler minivans. The resultant vehicles more closely resembled the immensely successful trio of Chrysler minivans; However, Chrysler would launch a completely redesigned minivan line a year before GM.

Two different wheelbase lengths were offered as well as dual sliding doors. Silhouettes, in keeping with their luxury positioning, offered many features as standard that were optional on competing makes and on its platform mates. In 1998, it became one of the first vehicles on the market to offer a VCR with overhead retractable LCD screen for back seat viewing, which has since become a "must-have" option for families with children. For 2001, the Silhouette received a minor facelift that included a new grille and front bumper.

Trim levels
base - 1997
GL - 1997–2004 Included: Cloth upholstery, 15" steel rims with hubcaps, air conditioning, map pockets in driver and passenger seats, power driver's seat, storage drawer under passenger front seat, an AM/FM stereo with single-CD player and seek-scan tuning, coaxial speakers, and clock, overhead console, fog lamps, and power front windows with automatic driver's side window. Later standard features were an AM/FM stereo with single-CD and cassette players and speed-compensated volume control, TheftLock, and clock, a garage door opener, rear seat audio controls, keyless entry, heated power mirrors, and automatic headlamps.
GLS - 1997–2004 Added: leather upholstery, rear parking aid, tri-zone climate control system, rear seat audio/climate controls, compass, garage door opener, an AM/FM stereo with single-CD and cassette players, seek-scan tuning, coaxial speakers and clock, leather wrapped steering wheel with audio controls, power front seats with driver's side memory, 16" alloy rims, and power sliding passenger door. 
GS - 1998–1999
Premiere - 1998–2004 Added: Entertainment system with DVD player with fold-down overhead color monitor for rear passengers, input jacks for video games or camcorders, 4 pairs of wireless headphones and rear seat visual/audio controls, heated front seats, and power sliding driver's side door.

Engine
3.4 L LA1 3400 V6

Safety criticism

A crash test video of the 1997 Trans Sport conducted by the Insurance Institute for Highway Safety (IIHS) resulted in some criticism due to extreme damage to the vehicle in the  moderate overlap crash test. The minivan received a "Poor" rating and was ranked the "Worst Performing Vehicle" by the institute as a result. This applied to the Silhouette and other second generation U-body minivans as well.

Some comments made by the IIHS after the first test in 1996 were:
 Major collapse of the occupant compartment left little survival space for the driver.
 Extreme steering wheel movement snapped the dummy's head backward.
 The unnatural position of the dummy's left foot indicates that an occupant's left leg would have been seriously injured in a real-world crash of this severity.
 The forces on the left lower leg were so high that the dummy's metal foot broke off at the ankle.
 The readings in the dummy showed the crash might have been fatal.

The safety issues of the Silhouette and other second generation U-body minivans were later addressed with the third generation redesign, which earned the highest rating of "Good" given by the institute in the moderate overlap crash test.

The National Highway Traffic Safety Administration gave the van 4 stars for driver protection and 3 stars for passenger protection in the  frontal impact test. In the side impact test, it received 5 stars for front passenger protection, and 5 stars for rear passenger protection.

More information on the Oldsmobile Silhouette/Pontiac Trans Sport:

Mixed sales success
The Silhouette and its platform mates achieved slightly better sales than their avant-garde predecessors, but also failed to capture a significant share of the market. The Silhouette was a close competitor in many of the categories deemed of importance, but was a winner in luxury, first in the world to offer factory video screen, the minivan market had become significantly more crowded with competing products that proved to be more desirable and throughout its production it was widely considered a second-tier competitor, certainly competent but not a stand-out in any category.

The Silhouette remained in production until the 2004 model year with minimal changes. As Oldsmobile itself was gradually phased out due to poor sales, a limited run of 500 units, dubbed Final 500, of each of the brands 5 remaining models were built and sold. The Silhouette received the Final 500 edition as well, applied exclusively to the Premiere trim. It featured a Dark Cherry Metallic paint, like the Alero, Bravada, Aurora, and Intrigue, custom vintage Oldsmobile badging on the front fenders and rear liftgate, Final 500 embroidered seat backs for the front and middle row (unique to the Final 500 Silhouettes) and front floor mats, and Aurora-styled chrome wheels. However, as a result of the assembly plant running out of production capacity due to fleet order obligations of its siblings, only 360 out of the 500 Silhouettes were built. Production of the Silhouette ended on March 31, 2004.

Successors and decline
The spiritual successor to the Oldsmobile Silhouette within the General Motors lineup is the Buick Terraza (2005-2007), which was built on an updated version of the U platform and occupied the luxury minivan slot previously occupied by the Silhouette.

However, due to poor sales of all the third-generation GM minivans in the United States, GM decided to exit the minivan market altogether in that region. Production of the Pontiac Montana SV6 ended after the 2006 model year in the United States, the Buick Terraza and Saturn Relay ended after the 2007 model year, and for the Chevrolet Uplander, production ceased in the United States after the 2008 model year and focused on the new crossover vehicle market. However, production of the Uplander (and Montana SV6) continued in Mexico and Canada until 2009 due to better sales in those countries.

One-Off Variants

Silhouette OSV (1999) - A modified version of the Silhouette that was created as part of "Oldsmobile Specialty Vehicles", an experiment in an aftermarket tuning brand for Oldsmobile. It debuted at the 1999 SEMA show alongside the OSV Alero and OSV Intrigue. It features: 3.4L SFI V6 engine with tuned intake and headers that does 210 hp @ 4400rpm, 270 lb-ft torque @ 2800 rpm, 4-speed Hydramatic 4T60-E automatic transmission,  RH Evolution C6 Wheels, 13-inch Brembo cross-drilled 4-wheel disc brakes, Koni struts and springs, front and rear spoilers, ground effects package, K&N filtration, Borla exhaust. On the exterior, the OSV Silhouette features a ground effects package similar to its OSV siblings, Candy Apple Red paint with ghosted Oldsmobile Tilted Rocket logos on the rear quarter panels, an OSV badge between the wheel wells and front doors, and silver inserts that block out the minivan's twin grille. Inside, the OSV is largely the same as its OSV siblings, sporting climate-controlled, 8-position Recaro Style seats, trimmed in neutral and red leather, and Titanium pedals. Unique to the OSV Silhouette is the fact that all of its seats are Recaro Style seats. All the headrests of the seats have the OSV logo embroidered into the headrests, like the OSV Alero and OSV Intrigue. It was sold in 2009 at the Barrett-Jackson Scottsdale auction, and again in 2012. In December 2020, an article by Hagerty reported that the OSV Silhouette was found listed for sale at Empire Motors in Canada. According the article, 3 OSV Silhouettes were built. The OSV Silhouette featured in the article has since been sold.
Silhouette OSV II (2000) - Another Silhouette modified for OSV, this time painted dark green. Little information exists on the Silhouette OSV II, but it appears largely the same as the Silhouette OSV I. It is part of a second batch of OSVs alongside the Alero OSV II and Intrigue OSV II. Like the other OSV II models, the whereabouts of the Silhouette OSV II are unknown.

References

External links

 Official Oldsmobile Silhouette website (last updated in 2004)

Silhouette
Minivans
Front-wheel-drive vehicles
1980s cars
1990s cars
2000s cars
Cars introduced in 1989
Cars discontinued in 2004